The Design 1012 ship (full name Emergency Fleet Corporation Design 1012) was a steel-hulled cargo ship design approved for production by the United States Shipping Boards Emergency Fleet Corporation (EFT) in World War I. They were referred to as the "Munrio"-type which was the name of the SS Munrio, a similar pre-EFT ship built at the Bethlehem Sparrows Point Shipyard.

References

Bibliography

External links
 EFC Design 1012: Illustrations

Standard ship types of the United States